Kade Chandler (born 13 January 2000) is an Australian rules footballer who plays for the Melbourne Football Club in the Australian Football League (AFL). He was selected at pick #15 in the 2019 Rookie draft. He made his senior debut against Sydney in round 22 of the 2019 season.

Statistics
Updated to the end of the 2022 season.

|-
| 2019 ||  || 37
| 1 || 0 || 0 || 4 || 3 || 7 || 2 || 9 || 0.0 || 0.0 || 4.0 || 3.0 || 7.0 || 2.0 || 9.0
|-
| 2020 ||  || 37
| 0 || – || – || – || – || – || – || – || – || – || – || – || – || – || –
|-
| 2021 ||  || 37
| 5 || 0 || 0 || 1 || 3 || 4 || 0 || 2 || 0.0 || 0.0 || 0.2 || 0.6 || 0.8 || 0.0 || 0.4
|-
| 2022 ||  || 37
| 4 || 0 || 1 || 4 || 3 || 7 || 3 || 0 || 0.0 || 0.3 || 1.0 || 0.8 || 1.8 || 0.8 || 0.0
|- class=sortbottom
! colspan=3 | Career
! 10 !! 0 !! 1 !! 9 !! 9 !! 18 !! 5 !! 11 !! 0.0 !! 0.1 !! 0.9 !! 0.9 !! 1.8 !! 0.5 !! 1.1
|}

Notes

References

External links

Kade Chandler from AFL Tables

Melbourne Football Club players
Norwood Football Club players
2000 births
Living people
Australian rules footballers from South Australia